Stenocryptis is a monotypic moth genus of the family Noctuidae. Its only species, Stenocryptis punctata, is found in the Khasi Hills of north-eastern India. Both the genus and species were first described by Warren in 1913.

References

Acontiinae
Monotypic moth genera